Ultraviolet is a 1998 British television series written and directed by Joe Ahearne and starring Jack Davenport, Susannah Harker, Idris Elba, and Philip Quast. The music was composed and performed by Sue Hewitt. The programme was produced by World Productions for Channel 4.

Synopsis
In the near future, global warming has caused vampires to come out of the shadows and attempt to retake the earth.
Detective Sergeant Michael Colefield (Jack Davenport) discovers that his best friend Jack (Stephen Moyer) has gone missing on the night before his wedding. Investigating Jack's disappearance leads Michael into the path of a secret paramilitary vampire-hunting organization supported by the British government and the Vatican. Michael learns that Jack has become a vampire. Michael remains devoted to his friend and abhors the brutal methods used by the organization's agents – including Vaughn Rice (Idris Elba) – until he realizes that Jack is lying about his situation and that the vampire hunters are correct in their assessment of the vampires. He allows himself to be recruited by the organization, but he hopes to find a middle ground.

Over the course of the series, Michael and the organization investigate vampire-related activity, often involving medical experimentation. Individual cases involve a woman who may be pregnant with a vampire fetus, a vampire test subject with synthetic blood, and the outbreak of a disease related to vampirism. The vampires are organized, and appear to be moving toward a common goal; the organization must determine what their agenda is. Living and working in the shadows takes a personal toll on the organization's agents: Michael's relationship with Jack's fiancée (Colette Brown) is threatened by his need to hide the truth from her; Angie Marsh (Susannah Harker) must come to terms with the loss of her husband, who was killed by the organization after becoming a vampire; Fr. Pearse Harman (Philip Quast) is diagnosed with terminal cancer, but fears that leaving his post may doom the world to whatever fate the vampires have in store for it.

The final episode reveals that the vampires' plan does not involve enslaving humanity as suspected. Instead, they plan to cause a nuclear winter, providing long-lasting darkness, and completely wiping out the threat of humanity with an engineered plague. Scientific advances made during their experiments will allow them to survive on synthetic blood and reproduce via live birth, eliminating the need for human victims.

Characters

Main characters

 Michael Colefield (played by Jack Davenport)
The protagonist of the series, Michael is a Detective Sergeant at the beginning of the series with the Metropolitan Police; he is close friends and partners with his colleague Jack in CID and is due to be the best man at his wedding. One of Michael's main informants, Pollard, is shot dead by a vampire in the first episode and this coupled with Jack's disappearance and subsequent transformation into a vampire is the catalyst for him joining Section 5. Over the course of the series, Michael must deal with balancing both the job and his personal life--he is attracted to Jack's fiance Kirsty but does not want to endanger her further.

 Dr Angela Marsh (played by Susannah Harker)
A cancer specialist and the team's resident doctor and lead scientist, Angie Marsh became involved in the organisation when her husband Robert, a prominent medical researcher, was approached to be recruited into the organisation. Robert killed himself and one of their daughters in order to prevent being converted by the vampires. Angie has remained extremely wary of allowing her remaining daughter, aged 11, any contact outside of home and restricts her movements outside of school. In the fifth episode of the series, she meets a vampire acquaintance of her deceased husband who tells her that he never stopped loving her, even after his death.

 Vaughan Rice (played by Idris Elba)
The organisation's main security lead, Vaughan Rice was the sole survivor of a squad of Gulf War soldiers who had been turned by vampires trying to study the affects of Gulf War Syndrome. Discharged with post-traumatic stress disorder, he was quickly recruited into the organisation to help eliminate the vampire infection. Vaughan shows very little emotion in his role, frequently referring to the vampires as 'leeches' and not hesitating to kill anyone who he suspects has been infected. In the fifth episode of the series, he is abducted and placed in a sealed garage with four coffins timed to open and only barely escapes with his life when he causes one to explode and break open the door.

 Pearse J. Harman (played by Philip Quast)
The leader of the organisation and a priest, Pearse has a droll and cynical personality but also provides occasional black humour to lighten the gravity of the situation. It was later revealed that he had a son before becoming a priest, who was killed by vampires. In the third episode of the series he starts to display the symptoms of cancer, which is later formally diagnosed by Angie. Despite his illness he continues to work, desperate to learn the secrets of vampire regeneration which are finally revealed in the last episode of the series.

Supporting characters
 Kirsty (played by Colette Brown)
Jack's fiance whom she is due to marry in the first episode, Kirsty remains oblivious to Jack's fate until the final episode of the series. Throughout the series she is keen to discover the truth about Jack, first from Michael who covers up what has really happened and then with a journalist who has unknowingly become infected by vampires himself.

 Frances (played by Fiona Dolman)
Michael's main contact on the outside. An investigative journalist, she is able to provide him with much expository information about the organisation he is working for and their main personnel.

Style and themes

The show attempted a modern and scientific approach to vampires. It eschewed much of the supernatural elements of vampire lore. The word "vampire" is never spoken in the show. The formal term for the antagonists is "Code Fives", derived from the Roman numeral for five, V, which is also the first letter in "vampire". A slang term used is "leeches". The clandestine vampire-hunting squad uses overwhelming numbers and modern "state-of-the-art" versions of traditional anti-vampire weapons: carbon bullets instead of wooden stakes; gas grenades with concentrated allicin, a compound derived from garlic; and video cameras as sights on firearms since vampires are invisible to electronic devices.

A prominent theme in the show is the emotional and social toll that the main characters' knowledge causes them. After joining the squad, Michael feels he must distance himself from his former friends in order to protect them. Angie March comments at one point that she's "getting a reputation as an anti-social parent" because she won't let her daughter attend social functions after dark. Vaughn Rice is in love with Angie, but cannot bring himself to tell her due to the stress of their job. At several points in the show, both Michael and a captured vampire question whether the team's methods are justified.

Vampirism as depicted in the series

Vampires in the series are depicted as ageless and immortal. They are stronger and faster than normal humans, to the extent that a physical encounter between a human and vampire will almost always be fatal for the human. Vampires lack most of the supernatural powers attributed to them in folklore, such as turning into bats, mist or wolves. The folkloric lack of a reflection is extended in the series: vampires are invisible to electronic devices. They cannot be imaged by video cameras, and cannot be recorded on videotape or film. Their voices cannot be transmitted electronically and ink will not hold an impression of their fingerprints. Vampire DNA is invisible under an electron microscope. Vampires use voice synthesis software to communicate via telephone. They use cars with blacked-out windows in order to move outside during the day, and time-locked coffins for long-distance travel.

Episode titles
 "Habeas Corpus"
 "In Nomine Patris"
 "Sub Judice"
 "Mea Culpa"
 "Terra Incognita"
 "Persona Non Grata"

Legacy
In 2000, the American Fox network developed a version of Ultraviolet, starring Eric Thal, Joanna Going and Mädchen Amick with Idris Elba reprising his role from the British series. The American version did not progress beyond an unaired pilot episode. Howard Gordon, one of the producers contracted to develop the series, said in an interview that "we screwed it up and it just didn't come out that well". The original UK version has been screened by the Sci-Fi Channel in the US. It was shown originally as a three-part miniseries (each part being two of the original episodes shown consecutively) and during some later airings all six episodes were shown in a marathon format.

See also
 Vampire film
 List of vampire television series

References

External links
 Ultraviolet fan site

 Official Ultraviolet Homepage preserved at The Internet Archive
 Joe Ahearne explains why Ultraviolet was not continued: "Well, there are so many reasons and I don't think you can point to any one. So, in no particular order..."
 

Channel 4 original programming
1990s British television miniseries
1998 British television series debuts
1998 British television series endings
1990s British drama television series
English-language television shows
British horror fiction television series
Vampires in television
1990s British horror television series
Climate change in fiction